Jozef Lupták (born 30 December 1969, Slovakia) is a Slovak cellist and artistic director. He is a performer of classical and contemporary cello repertoire as well as Chassidic and Roma-Gypsy revivalist music in Eastern Europe and is the artistic director of the Konvergencie Festivals in Slovakia.

Awards

 Award for Cultural Activity in Music for "After Phurikane", 2010 & 2011
 Nomination for the Crystal Wing Awards, 2010
 Frico Kafenda Award, 2009
 Award from the Minister of Culture for Success as Concert Artist & Konvergencie Festival, 2009
 May Mukle Cello Prize, Royal Academy of Music, London, 1997
 Banff Centre for the Arts, Long Term Artistic Residency, Canada, 1994
 International Cello Competition, Liezen, Austria, 1994
 International Competition for Young Cellists, Jury Prize, Murcia, Spain, 1989

Selected Discography
Source:
 In the space of love, Evgeni Irshai, Slovak Radio Symphony Orchestra, Slovak Music Fund, 2013
 Chassidic Songs: Chassidic Jewish Music with Rabbi Baruch Myers, Konvergencie Records, 2010
 After Phurikane: Ancient Roma Songs Anew, Zudro 2010
 Namah Chamber music by Peter Machajdík, Hudobný fond CD © 2008 SF 00542131
 Jozef Luptal-Cello Live Recital from St John's, Smith Square, Slovak Music Centre
 Cello-Bach, Jeffery, Burgr, Iršai, Zagar, Wolff, Improvisations: MI 2001
 Johann Sebastian Bach – Complete Suites for Solo Cello – BWV 1007–1012: First complete Slovak Recording, Porta Libri, 2001
 Music For Cello – Vladimír Godár: Slovart Records 1999 
 Chamber Music of Vladimír Godár: Albrecht Quartet, Nora Skuta, Slovart Music 1996
 Slovak Composers (Matej, Zagar, Burlas): Veni ensemblom /Slov.hudobný fond/1992 Musica/1996 
 Philip Ratliff – String Quartett: Banff Centre Label, 1994
 Brahms – Sonate F dur, Hindemith – Solo Sonate, M.Burlas- Agónia: with pianist Nora Skuta, OPUS Records, 1994

References

External links
 Personal Website
 Radio NZ Concert Interview with Jozef Luptak
 "Jozef Lupták", website of Slovak Music Centre, accessed 5 June 2020

1969 births
Living people
Cellists
Slovak musicians